Siemkowo may refer to the following places in Poland:

Siemkowo, Kuyavian-Pomeranian Voivodeship
Siemkowo, Warmian-Masurian Voivodeship